Manhattan Chamber of Commerce is a nonprofit organization that represents and supports local businesses across the borough of Manhattan in New York City.

History
The Manhattan Chamber of Commerce was established in July 1920 as the Yorkville Chamber of Commerce. It was founded by 11 prominent merchants in the Yorkville neighborhood of Manhattan's Upper East Side, which at the time was inhabited predominantly by German-born immigrants. Their mission was “to foster and improve the trade and commerce of Yorkville…and to promote the prosperity and general welfare thereof". This was particularly important in the wake of World War I, when a wave of anti-German sentiment had spread throughout the United States. Over the decades, the Chamber expanded to encompass Mid-East Manhattan, then Mid-Manhattan and finally, the entire borough of Manhattan.

Mission
Today, the Manhattan Chamber of Commerce represents and supports more than 105,000 businesses in the Borough. The organization

** advances economic empowerment by fostering "game-changing" connections for its members

** provides guidance to make businesses more competitive and profitable

** and works with government to improve the local business climate.

The Chamber also has two 501(c)3 nonprofit arms: its foundation provides resources, education and other programming to the business community. Its community benefit fund hosts two of the oldest and largest street fairs in the city and its proceeds support the good work of charitable organizations focused on improving the quality of life in Manhattan.

Leadership
The current President and CEO is Jessica Walker, who took the helm in February 2016. The Board Chairman is Don Winter, the founder and CEO of Encompass Media Group and the publisher of Resident Magazine.

References

Chambers of commerce in the United States
Organizations established in 1920
Organizations based in Manhattan
1920 establishments in New York City